Robert Wienert Nickle  (May 22, 1919 – November 12, 1980) was a 20th-century American artist known primarily for his "street scrap" collage work.

Nickle was born in Saginaw, Michigan. In 1943, he graduated from the University of Michigan where he studied architecture and design. He enlisted in the Navy that May, and served in the South Pacific.

Nickle worked and taught primarily in Chicago, Illinois where he was affiliated with the New Bauhaus under László Moholy-Nagy, then with the University of Illinois at Chicago (UIC).

Exhibits
Robert Nickle's work is included in the permanent collections of the Art Institute of Chicago, David and Alfred Smart Gallery, Whitney Museum of American Art, the Albright-Knox Art Gallery, the Indianapolis Museum, Smithsonian Museum, Carnegie Institute Museum and the National Gallery in Washington.

References

External links
More images

People from Saginaw, Michigan
Taubman College of Architecture and Urban Planning alumni
1919 births
1980 deaths
Artists from Chicago
United States Navy personnel of World War II